The Morris Arboretum of the University of Pennsylvania (37 ha / 92 acres) is the official arboretum of the Commonwealth of Pennsylvania. The Arboretum is open daily except for major holidays. It is located at 100 East Northwestern Avenue, Chestnut Hill, Philadelphia, Pennsylvania.

History
The Arboretum was formerly the estate of John T. (1847-1915) and Lydia T. Morris (1849-1932), a brother and sister who purchased and landscaped much of the arboretum's current site beginning in 1887. John Morris was interested in growing plants from around the world, including those collected in China by E. H. Wilson around 1900, and many of today's specimens date to Morris' original plantings. The estate became a public arboretum in 1933, after Lydia Morris' death.

Collection

Today the arboretum contains more than 13,000 labelled plants of over 2,500 types, representing the temperate floras of North America, Asia, and Europe, with a primary focus on Asia. Significant collections include native azaleas, conifers, hollies, magnolia species, maples, roses, and witch hazels. The arboretum has identified 17 trees in its collection as outstanding specimens: Abies cephalonica, Abies holophylla, Acer buergerianum, Aesculus flava, Cedrus libani var. atlantica 'Glauca', Cercidiphyllum japonicum, Fagus engleriana, Fagus sylvatica f. pendula, Metasequoia glyptostroboides, Pinus bungeana, Platanus × acerifolia, Quercus alba, Quercus × benderi, Tsuga canadensis f. pendula, Ulmus glabra 'Horizontalis', Ulmus parvifolia, and Zelkova serrata.

Features
The arboretum is set within a fine, mature landscape, primarily designed in the English park style but with Japanese influences. It includes winding paths and streams, a swan pond, formal rose gardens, and large sweeps of azaleas, rhododendrons, and magnolias. Notable aspects of the arboretum are as follows:

 Compton Mansion (aka Morris House, 1887-1888, demolished 1968)
 Dawn Redwoods - Species of trees once thought to be extinct now found.
 English Park (circa 1912) - mainly planted with species collected in China, with significant collections of maples, witch hazels, dogwoods, cherries, and stuartias.
 Fernery (1899) - an 8-sided glass house said to be the only remaining free-standing Victorian fernery in North America. Morris "hired Japanese garden makers Kushibiki and Arai to arrange one hundred tons of local Wissahickon schist into rockery formations resembling a cave or mountain cliff accented by delicate waterfalls, a flowing stream bed, and a goldfish pond." He ordered his ferns from London experts William and John Birkenhead and botanically grouped and labelled the 523 fern and 47 Selaginella (club moss) varieties.
 Garden railway - G scale trains and trolley cars running on 45 mm track (1¾"), and representing railroads throughout history, including freight and passenger models.
 Greenhouse - closed to the public; little now remains of Morris' original structure. 
 Hillcrest Pavilion - Restrooms, drinking fountains, and picnic benches with Hillcrest Avenue running behind it (hence the name). 
 Japanese Overlook (1912) - a hybrid of English rock garden with Japanese garden, landscaped with fudo stones, stone lanterns, and Japanese maples, conifers, and smaller acid-loving plants. 
 Japanese Hill and Water Garden (1905) - Tsukiyama-niwa style garden with hills, rocks, water, trees, bridges, paths, shrines and lanterns.
 Key Fountain - Key-Shaped decorative fountain in English Park
 Log Cabin - rustic log cabin with working hand-operated water pump
 Mercury Loggia and Ravine Garden (1913) - classical loggia housing a sculpture of "Mercury at rest", with grotto and a picturesque rock garden within the valley below.
 Meadow Parking Lot - Overflow parking lot located at bottom of the hill.
 Oak Alee - walkway lined with oak trees on both sides.
 Out on a Limb - metal walkway for close-up view of trees
 Pennock Garden - exotic flower garden with large rectangular fountain.
 Rose Garden (1888) - a buxus-edged rose garden in four quadrants with a fountain in the middle. 
 Rock Wall Garden (1924) - alpine plants on a six-foot-high wall.
 Swan Pond (1905) - a small lake created by digging and damming the East Brook.
 Sculpture Garden
 Step Fountain - Staircase-shaped fountain in English Park
 Visitor Center & Gift Shop - Restrooms, Drinking Fountains, Seasonal Cafe.

Morris Arboretum also owns Springfield Mill, which is located opposite the main entrance.  The grist mill has been restored and is open to the public once a month for grinding demonstrations.

See also 
 List of botanical gardens in the United States
 List of parks in Philadelphia

References

External links 

 Morris Arboretum
 Compton's listing at the Historic American Buildings Survey
 Morris Arboretum: A living collection (2000). Sculpture magazine / artdesigncafe. March 2000. Retrieved March 19, 2011.

1889 establishments in Pennsylvania
Arboreta in Pennsylvania
Historic districts in Philadelphia
National Register of Historic Places in Philadelphia
Parks in Montgomery County, Pennsylvania
Parks in Philadelphia
Protected areas established in 1978
University of Pennsylvania
Chestnut Hill, Philadelphia
Historic districts on the National Register of Historic Places in Pennsylvania